Bhanupratappur Railway station is a station in  Bhanupratappur in Kanker district in the Indian state of Chhattisgarh.

Bhanupratappur lies on the Dalli Rajhara–Jagdalpur line, which is currently under construction. As of August 2020, laying of tracks, construction of station, and trial run of locomotives have been completed until Antagarh (AAGH),  to the south of Bhanupratappur. Daily DEMU services between Keoti and Raipur serve the station.

References 

Railway junction stations in Chhattisgarh